Henry-William Obiajulu Melifonwu (born April 5, 1994) is an American football safety who is a free agent. He played college football at UConn. He was selected in the second round of the 2017 NFL Draft by the Oakland Raiders.

Early years
Henry William Obiajulu Melifonwu was born in London on April 5, 1994. His parents are Igbo Nigerians who moved to England. At age 3, Melifonwu's family moved to the USA. His middle name, Obiajulu, means 'consoled heart'. He has one older brother Michael, a sister, and two younger brothers, Nonso and Ifeatu.

Melifonwu attended Grafton High School in Grafton, Massachusetts. He played defensive back, quarterback and running back. As a senior, he rushed for 1,394 yards with 17 touchdowns. Melifonwu committed to the University of Connecticut to play college football.

College career
Melifonwu redshirted his first year at Connecticut in 2012. As a redshirt freshman in 2013, he started all 12 games and had 70 tackles and two interceptions. As a redshirt sophomore in 2014, he started 11 games, recording 75 tackles. As a redshirt junior in 2015, he started 12 of 13 games and had 88 tackles and two interceptions. As a senior in 2016, he started all 13 games and recorded 118 tackles and four interceptions.

Professional career
Melifonwu received an invitation to the Senior Bowl and made three combined tackles as a part of the North who lost 16-15 to the South. He was able to raise his draft stock after performing well during the Senior Bowl practices. Melifonwu attended the NFL Combine and completed the majority of combine and positional drills, but decided to skip the three-cone drill and short shuttle. He had impressive performances in the vertical jump, broad jump, and 40-yard dash that further raised his draft stock. He also participated at Connecticut's Pro Day and completed the short shuttle, three-cone drill,
and positional drills in front of 25 NFL scouts from 20 NFL teams. His numbers in the short shuttle and three-cone drill would've ranked second among all positions if he would've posted those times at the NFL Combine. He had private workouts and visits with 11 NFL teams, including the San Francisco 49ers, Cleveland Browns, Dallas Cowboys, Miami Dolphins, Philadelphia Eagles, Detroit Lions, Carolina Panthers, Washington Redskins, New Orleans Saints, Seattle Seahawks, and Pittsburgh Steelers. NFL draft experts and analysts projected him to be a second round pick. He was ranked the fourth best strong safety in the draft by NFLDraftScout.com, the fourth best safety by NFL analysts Mike Mayock and Bucky Brooks, was ranked the fifth best safety by ESPN, and was ranked the sixth best safety by Sports Illustrated.

Oakland Raiders
The Oakland Raiders selected Melifonwu in the second round (56th overall) of the 2017 NFL Draft. He was placed on injured reserve on September 5, 2017, with eligibility to return in 2017. He was activated from injured reserve to the active roster on November 4, 2017. He was placed back on injured reserve on December 15, 2017 after having hip surgery.

On August 23, 2018, Melifonwu was waived/injured by the Raiders. He was placed on injured reserve the next day after clearing waivers. He was released on October 23, 2018.

New England Patriots
On November 5, 2018, Melifonwu signed a two-year contract with the New England Patriots. Melifonwu appeared in 2 games for the Patriots, recording 3 tackles. Melifonwu and the Patriots eventually reached Super Bowl LIII where they beat the Los Angeles Rams 13-3.

On September 9, 2019, Melifonwu was waived by the Patriots and re-signed to the practice squad. He signed a reserve/future contract with the Patriots on January 6, 2020.

On April 27, 2020, Melifonwu was released by the Patriots.

San Francisco 49ers
On January 4, 2021, Melifonwu signed a reserve/future contract with the San Francisco 49ers. He was waived on April 29, 2021.

Philadelphia Eagles
On July 29, 2021, the Philadelphia Eagles signed Melifonwu. He was waived/injured on August 9, 2021 and placed on injured reserve. He was released on September 14, 2021.

Tampa Bay Bandits
Melifonwu was drafted by the Tampa Bay Bandits in the 18th round of the 2022 USFL Draft. He was transferred to the team's inactive roster on May 6, 2022, with a thigh injury. He was moved back to the active roster on May 11.

St. Louis BattleHawks
On February 4, 2023, Melifonwu was signed by the St. Louis BattleHawks. He was released on February 9, 2023.

Personal life
His younger brother, Ifeatu Melifonwu, played college football at Syracuse and was selected by the Detroit Lions in the 3rd round of the 2021 NFL Draft.

References

External links
Connecticut Huskies bio
New England Patriots bio

1994 births
Living people
English players of American football
People from Grafton, Massachusetts
Sportspeople from Worcester County, Massachusetts
Igbo sportspeople
English people of Igbo descent
American people of Igbo descent
Players of American football from Massachusetts
American football safeties
UConn Huskies football players
Oakland Raiders players
New England Patriots players
San Francisco 49ers players
Philadelphia Eagles players
Tampa Bay Bandits (2022) players